Philadelphia Parks & Recreation (PPR) is the municipal department responsible for managing parks, recreation centers, playgrounds, trails, community gardens, and historic properties in Philadelphia, Pennsylvania. Its inventory includes more than 150 parks and 170 recreation centers and playgrounds. It became the successor to the Fairmount Park Commission and the City of Philadelphia Department of Recreation in 2010.

General overview

In addition to overseeing nearly 10,200 acres of land and hundreds of recreation centers, some of the amenities found in the parks and recreation system include 71 outdoor pools, 223 miles of trails, 404 baseball/softball fields, 40 historic sites, 25 public access computing centers, 460 basketball courts and 66 gardens, farms and orchards.

Philadelphia Parks & Recreation also offers approximately 100 After School Programs throughout the city and over 130 summer camps, including neighborhood camps, specialty camps and special needs camps. Other PPR programs focus on urban agriculture, visual and performing arts, environmental education and outdoor recreation, along with sports and athletics opportunities. In addition, PPR operates a food program that feeds approximately 30,000 kids per day in the summer and around 4,000 per day during the school year.

Department services include ecosystem management, historic preservation, event permitting and management, citizen engagement, youth employment, tree services and concessions. Philadelphia Parks & Recreation also organizes signature events and entertainment series like the Mummers Parade, Broad Street Run, The Oval and the Dell Music Center.

Neighborhood and regional parks
Among the department's more than 150 neighborhood and regional parks are:

See also

List of houses in Fairmount Park

References

External links

History of Philadelphia Parks & Recreation
Pathport to Philadelphia Parks & Recreation
TreePhilly

Fairmount Park
Municipal parks in Philadelphia
National Register of Historic Places in Philadelphia
Georgian architecture in Pennsylvania
Federal architecture in Pennsylvania
Colonial Revival architecture in Pennsylvania
Parks in Philadelphia
Historic districts on the National Register of Historic Places in Pennsylvania
Works Progress Administration in Pennsylvania
World's fair sites in Pennsylvania
Centennial Exposition
Government departments of Philadelphia